The Ashton Memorial is a folly in Williamson Park, Lancaster, Lancashire, England built between 1907 and 1909 by the millionaire industrialist Lord Ashton in memory of his second wife, Jessy, at a cost of £87,000 (equivalent to £ in ).

Description

At around 150 feet (50 m) tall, it dominates the Lancaster skyline and is visible for many miles around, and has views of the surrounding area including Morecambe Bay. The building is in the Edwardian Baroque style and was designed by John Belcher. It has been described as "England's grandest folly" and the "Taj Mahal of the North". The dome is externally of copper, the main stone used is Portland stone although the steps are of hard wearing granite from Cornwall.

The external stonework is hung on a steel frame as found in modern buildings and only forms a weatherproof covering without being loadbearing. In recent times this steelwork has caused problems for the conservation of the building. Externally around the dome are sculptures representing "Commerce", "Science", "Industry" and "Art" by Herbert Hampton, who was also responsible for the design of the Queen Victoria Memorial, Lancaster commissioned by James Williamson, 1st Baron Ashton the previous year. The interior of the dome has allegorical paintings of "Commerce", "Art" and "History" by George Murray. The floor is of white, black and red marble.

Today, the memorial serves as an exhibition space on the upper floor and a venue for concerts and weddings.

The Ashton Memorial stands coincidentally close to the mathematical centre point of the United Kingdom of Great Britain and Northern Ireland, excluding the Isle of Man. See Centre points of the United Kingdom.

Gallery

See also

Grade I listed buildings in Lancashire
Listed buildings in Lancaster, Lancashire

References
Notes

Bibliography

External links

The Ashton Memorial at Williamson Park
 Virtual tour at virtual-lancaster.
Ashton Memorial Lancaster City Council
Virtual tour at VRlancaster.

Edwardian architecture
Monuments and memorials in Lancashire
Buildings and structures in Lancaster, Lancashire
Tourist attractions in Lancaster, Lancashire
Folly buildings in England
Domes
Baroque Revival architecture
Grade I listed buildings in Lancashire
Buildings and structures completed in 1909